Mercury is the sixth studio album by American indie rock band American Music Club. It was released in March 1993 on Reprise Records as their major-label debut. Virgin Records released the album in the United Kingdom.

"I've Been a Mess" remained a staple of the band's concerts. The album's title comes from a beverage featured in the lyrics of "Challenger."

Release
"Johnny Mathis' Feet" and "Keep Me Around" were released as singles from Mercury. The "Johnny Mathis' Feet" CD had a 10-track bonus live CD; it was recorded at Slim's in San Francisco on June 15, 1993, and is usually called Live at Slim's.

A black-and-white 11-minute promotional VHS tape, generally referred to as "1992 press kit," was issued in advance of the album's release.  This contained interviews with each band member, live performances, studio footage, and assorted clips, including of Mark Eitzel riding his bike by the ocean.  The band members talk at length about the origins of American Music Club, with two of them commenting on how scary it is to be in the band.

Critical reception

Spin magazine ranked Mercury the 14th best album of 1993. The same magazine called the album a "lushly arranged collision between indie rock and adult-alternative music". Treble ranked the album among the "10 Essential Slowcore Albums".

Legacy
In a retrospective "On Second Thought" feature for Stylus Magazine, critic Todd Hutlock wrote that "the rock-solid ensemble musicianship and straightforward production... let in just enough light to let Eitzel's darkness contrast but not overwhelm things."

Franz Nicolay of the Hold Steady has cited Mercury as one of his biggest musical influences.

Track listing

Personnel

American Music Club
 Mark Eitzel
 Bruce Kaphan
 Tim Mooney
 Daniel Pearson
 Vudi

Production
 Tchad Blake – engineering, mixing
 Mitchell Froom – production
 John Paterno – assistant engineer, additional engineering on "Over and Done"
 Bob Ludwig – mastering

Artwork and design
 Bobby Neal Adams – cover and inlay photography
 Jeff Gold – art direction
 Tom Recchion – art direction, design
 Ralf Strathmann – other photography

Management
 Wally Brill – management for Building Management
 Ross Schwartz – management for Building Management

Production notes
 All songs recorded and mixed at Sunset Sound Factory, Hollywood, November–December 1992, and mastered at Gateway Mastering.

Charts

References

1993 albums
American Music Club albums
Albums produced by Mitchell Froom
Reprise Records albums